, is a sub-kilometer asteroid, classified as a near-Earth object of the Apollo group, approximately  in diameter. The object was first observed on 24 September 2017, by cometary discoverer Alex Gibbs with the Mount Lemmon Survey at Mount Lemmon Observatory, Arizona, in the United States.

Orbit and classification 

 is a member of the Apollo asteroids, which cross the orbit of Earth. Apollo's are the largest group of near-Earth objects with nearly 10 thousand known objects.

The object orbits the Sun at a distance of 0.87–1.17 AU once every 374 days (semi-major axis of 1.02 AU). Its orbit has an eccentricity of 0.15 and an inclination of 13° with respect to the ecliptic. The body's observation arc begins with its first observation at Mount Lemmon in September 2017.

Asteroid pair 

They form a pair of asteroids which at some point in the past had very small relative velocities (in the order of only a few meters per second), and may represent a former binary system where the two bodies became gravitationally unbound – by a YORP-induced fission, for example – and subsequently followed separate orbits around the Sun. Other pairs may have been formed from collisional breakup of a parent body. Both  and  shows the highest observed level of dynamical coherence among the population of near-Earth objects.

Numbering and naming 

This minor planet has neither been numbered nor named.

Physical characteristics 

 has an absolute magnitude of 23.3 which gives a calculated mean diameter between 58 and 130 meters for an assumed geometric albedo of 0.25 and 0.05, respectively.

References

External links 
 MPEC 2017-S186: 2017 SN16, Minor Planet Electronic Circular
 MPEC 2018-R38 : 2017 SN16, Minor Planet Electronic Circular
 List Of Apollo Minor Planets (by designation), Minor Planet Center
 Asteroid pairs and clusters, Johnston's Archive
 
 
 

Minor planet object articles (unnumbered)

20170924